is a railway station on the Nippō Main Line operated by the Kyūshū Railway Company in Beppu, Ōita, Japan.

Lines

Layout 
The station consists of a side and an island platform serving three tracks at grade with several sidings branching off. The station building is located on the west side of the tracks and is a modern hashigami structure where the station facilities are located on a bridge spanning the tracks. An enclosed waiting room, a staffed ticket window and an automatic ticket machine are located all on level 2 of the building which can be accessed from street level by means of steps or an elevator. After the ticket gate, separate sets of elevators lead to the platforms. The bridge also serves as a free passage, with a separate entrance to the station on the west side of the tracks.

Management of the station has been outsourced to the JR Kyushu Tetsudou Eigyou Co., a wholly owned subsidiary of JR Kyushu specialising in station services. It staffs the ticket booth which is equipped with a Midori no Madoguchi facility.

Adjacent stations

History
The Kyushu Railway was nationalised on 1 July 1907. Japanese Government Railways (JGR), designated the track as the Hōshū Main Line on 12 October 1909 and expanded it southwards in phases, with Beppu opening as the new southern terminus on 16 July 1911. On the same day, Kamegawa was opened as an intermediate station on the new track. With the privatization of Japanese National Railways (JNR), the successor of JGR, on 1 April 1987, the station came under the control of JR Kyushu.

Passenger statistics
In fiscal 2016, the station was used by an average of 1,546 passengers daily (boarding passengers only), and it ranked 116th among the busiest stations of JR Kyushu.

See also
List of railway stations in Japan

References

External links

  

Railway stations in Ōita Prefecture
Railway stations in Japan opened in 1911
Beppu, Ōita